Garhi Khairo railway station is located in Garhi Khairo Tehsil, Pakistan.

See also
 List of railway stations in Pakistan
 Pakistan Railways
 Garhi Khairo Tehsil
 Jacobabad District

References

Railway stations in Jacobabad District
Railway stations on Larkana–Jacobabad line